Gretna lacida, commonly known as the scarce crepuscular skipper, is a species of butterfly in the family Hesperiidae. It is found in Sierra Leone, Liberia, Ivory Coast, possibly Nigeria, Cameroon, Gabon, the Republic of the Congo and the central part of the Democratic Republic of the Congo. The habitat consists of forests.

References

Butterflies described in 1876
Erionotini
Butterflies of Africa
Taxa named by William Chapman Hewitson